CFPA may refer to:
Connecticut Forest and Park Association
Consumer Finance Protection Agency, an independent agency of the United States government
CKTG-FM, Canadian radio station launched as CFPA in 1944
Concordville Fire & Protective Association, a fire and rescue department in Concordville, PA
China Foundation for Poverty Alleviation, an international humanitarian organization headquartered in Beijing